Myron Newton Morris (November 19, 1810 – July 9, 1885) was an American minister and politician.

Morris, the youngest child of Newton J. and Eunice (Newton) Morris, was born on one of the Yale College farms in Warren, Litchfield County, Connecticut, November 19, 1810.  After his father's death, in 1830, he took charge of the farm for a year or two, and was then at length able to begin his preparation for Yale, where he graduated in 1837.  After graduation he was principal of Bacon Academy, in Colchester, Conn., until the summer of 1838, and again from March, 1840, until the summer of 1843; in the interval he was instructor in the Teachers' Academy, Andover, Mass. He began theological studies while in Andover, and was licensed to preach shortly after his final withdrawal from Bacon Academy. He had married, January 10, 1838, Julia S., daughter of Elisha Avery, of Colchester, and he retained his residence there—engaged in farming, private teaching, and preaching—until January, 1845, when he removed to Norwich, Conn, where he served as teacher in the academy for two terms. While living there he accepted a call to the Congregational Church in North Stonington, Connecticut, over which he was ordained, April 15, 1846. After a pleasant pastorate of six years, he was induced, chiefly for the sake of educational advantages to his children, to accept a thrice-repeated call to the Congregational Church in West Hartford, Conn, where he was installed, July 1, 1852, His service there was terminated by his resignation, April 27, 1875, but his home continued among his people. While still a pastor in July, 1867, he was elected a Fellow of Yale College, and this office he retained until his death. He was twice a Representative (in 1872 and 1875) from West Hartford to the Connecticut Legislature, and for many years one of the school-visitors for the town.  He died in West Hartford, after four days' illness, from pleurisy, July 9, 1885, in his 75th year.

His wife died March 26, 1854, and he next married, May 8, 1855, Emeline, youngest daughter of Samuel Whitman, of West Hartford, who survived him, as did a daughter and two sons by his first marriage, and a son by his second marriage; two sons died in infancy, and a third in early manhood.  He published three historical discourses. In a Memorial volume which has been issued by the church in West Haitford, a tribute is paid to his character and services.

External links

1810 births
1885 deaths
People from Warren, Connecticut
Yale College alumni
American Congregationalist ministers
Members of the Connecticut House of Representatives
American male writers
19th-century American politicians
19th-century American clergy